Laryngitis is an inflammation of the larynx.

Laryngitis may also refer to:

 "Laryngitis" (Glee), a TV episode by Glee
 Obstructive laryngitis, a respiratory condition

See also 
 John Laurinaitis (born 1962), former professional wrestler